The LNM Institute of Information Technology (LNMIIT), is an institute of higher learning that is deemed to be a university. It is located in Jaipur, India, on a  campus. The institute is a public-private partnership venture between the LNM Foundation and the Government of Rajasthan and operates as an autonomous non-profit organization.

Expansion
During a dinner hosted for Chief Minister Ashok Gehlot, steel tycoon Lakshmi Mittal discussed plans to expand his Jaipur-based Lakshmi Niwas Mittal Institute of Information Technology (LNMIIT). In 2015, it was ranked as the third best private engineering college in the country by EDU-RAND. As a deemed university, LNMIIT was jointly set up by the state government and the Lakshmi and Usha Mittal Foundation, as an autonomous non-profit organization. Mittal was also the part of the meeting where the delegation discussed the proposed 2012 Jaipur convention for NRIs from the state. The London chapter of the foundation volunteered to coordinate with (non-resident Indians (NRIs) across Europe for the 2012 convention.

The institute began in 2003 with a branch, Communication and Computer Engineering (CCE), in a temporary campus in Jaipur. Today, the institute operates out of its campus, about 10 km from the Jaipur-Agra Highway and 20 km from the heart of Jaipur City. The institute offers the following four disciplines:
  Communication and Computer Engineering (CCE)
  Electronics and Communication Engineering (ECE)
  Computer Science Engineering (CSE)
  Mechanical Engineering (ME)

The institute infrastructure includes on-campus housing, hostels for boys and girls, sports facilities, shopping complex, studio apartments and faculty housing, an open-air theatre, lecture halls, labs, library, gym and LAN/WiFi connectivity in all hostels.

Admission and courses

Undergraduate program
Students who appear in the Joint Entrance Examination Main conducted by the Central Board of Secondary Education / National Test Agency are eligible to apply for admission to the LNMIIT. The admission in the Undergraduate programme at LNMIIT is very competitive and the Institute considers the JEE MAIN marks as well as the DASA mode(Foreign National/PIO/NRI) to offer admissions to the candidates.

LNMIIT offers direct admission to boys within the top 10 ranks and girls within the top 20 ranks in the senior secondary exam of the 12th class conducted by the Board of Secondary Education, Rajasthan. Only students who have studied physics, chemistry, math, and English in 12th class are considered for admission through this route.

Rankings

The National Institutional Ranking Framework (NIRF) ranked it 194 among engineering colleges in 2020.

References

External links 
 

Deemed universities in Rajasthan
Engineering colleges in Jaipur
Educational institutions established in 2003
2003 establishments in Rajasthan